Polypterus teugelsi (Teugelsi bichir) is a species of carnivorous, nocturnal bichir (a group of ray-finned fishes) that lives in the Cross River drainage basin in the country of Cameroon. P. teugelsi was described in 2004 by Ralf Britz. It can grow to up to 16 inches long.  It has a network of black markings on the dorsal surface and the medial and pelvic fins, completely black pectoral fins, and an orange ventral surface. The species is most commonly found in shady, slow-moving streams with lush foliage on the edge of the streams. It does not have a very good sense of vision and instead uses its smelling abilities to find food. The IUCN does not have enough data to evaluate the condition of this species.

P. teugelsi has some interesting adaptations. Its swim bladder, unlike most fishes, is divided into two parts. The right side is rather larger, and can function as a breathing organ if needed. Therefore, P. teugelsi can survive for some time out of water (if it is kept moist) through breathing air. In addition, P. teugelsi have gills that resemble those of young amphibians.

Named in honor of Guy Teugels (1954–2003), curator of fishes at the Musée Royale de l’Afrique Centrale.

References

Polypteridae
Taxa named by Ralf Britz
Fish described in 2004
Endemic fauna of Cameroon
Freshwater fish of Cameroon